Carmen Santos (8 June 1904 – 24 September 1952) was a Portuguese-born Brazilian actress and film producer. Santos began acting at the age of fifteen, and started producing films from 1930 onwards with Blood of Minas Gerais. She founded her own film studio Brasil Vita Filmes in Rio de Janeiro. Santos directed the 1948 film Minas Conspiracy, in which she also starred.

Selected filmography
 Blood of Minas Gerais (1930)
 Minas Conspiracy (1948)

References

Bibliography 
 Marsh, Leslie. Brazilian Women's Filmmaking: From Dictatorship to Democracy. University of Illinois Press, 2012.
 Shaw, Lisa & Dennison, Stephanie. Brazilian National Cinema. Routledge, 2014.

External links 
 
 Carmen Santos at the Women Film Pioneers Project

1904 births
1952 deaths
Brazilian film producers
Brazilian film directors
Brazilian women film directors
Brazilian women film producers
Brazilian film actresses
Brazilian screenwriters
Portuguese film producers
Portuguese film directors
Portuguese women film directors
Portuguese women film producers
Portuguese film actresses
Portuguese screenwriters
20th-century Brazilian actresses
Women film pioneers
20th-century screenwriters
Brazilian women screenwriters
Portuguese emigrants to Brazil